Hyblaea is a genus of moths of the family Hyblaeidae first described by Johan Christian Fabricius in 1793.

Description
Head very small. Palpi porrect (extending forward) and rostriform (beak shaped). Antennae minutely ciliated in male. Thorax and abdomen smoothly scaled. Tibia clothed with long hairs and spineless. Forewings with costa arched near base, with lobed inner margin. The cell open. Veins 6 to 9 arise from close to angle of cell. Hindwings with open cell. Vein 8 anastomosing with vein 7 to near middle of cell.

Taxonomy
The genus consists of the following species:

References

Hyblaeidae
Moth genera